Chankuwaña (Aymara for throw something so that people can scramble or fight for it, Hispanicized spelling Chancoaña, Chancohuana, Chancohuaña, Chancohuañachico, Chancohuana Chico) is a mountain in the Wansu mountain range in the Andes of Peru, about  high. It is situated in the Apurímac Region, Antabamba Province, Oropesa District, and in the Cusco Region, Chumbivilcas Province, Santo Tomás District, north of the mountain Waytani and southeast of the mountain Wayunka.

See also 
 Wamanmarka

References 

Mountains of Peru
Mountains of Apurímac Region
Mountains of Cusco Region